Hyssopus may refer to:
Hyssopus (wasp), a genus of wasps in the family Eulophidae
Hyssopus (plant), a genus of aromatic plants in the family Lamiaceae known as hyssop